Marcela is a feminine given name which may refer to:

Musicians

Marcela Bovio, Mexican musician
Marcela Lucatelli (born 1988), Brazilian composer
Marcela Morelo, Argentine singer-songwriter
 Marcela Rodríguez, Mexican composer

Politicians

Marcela Guerra Castillo, Mexican politician
Marcela Lombardo Otero, Mexican politician
Marcela Mitaynes, American politician

Sportspeople
Marcela Acuña, Argentine boxer
Marcela Cuesta, Costa Rican swimmer 
Marcela Hussey, Argentine field hockey player 
Marcela Kubalčíková, Czech swimmer
Marcela Marić, Croatian Olympic diver
Marcela Richezza, Argentine field hockey player
Marcela (wrestler), ring name of professional wrestler María Elena Santamaría Gómez

Writers 
Marcela Delpastre, French-Occitan author
Marcela Paz, Chilean novelist
Marcela Serrano, another Chilean novelist

Other
Marcela Agoncillo, Filipina seamstress of the first Philippine flag
Marcela Barrozo, Brazilian actress
Marcela Bilek, Czech-Australian physicist
Marcela Carena, Argentine-born U.S. physicist
Marcela Contreras, Chilean-British blood expert and educator
Marcela Gallego, Colombian actress
Marcela Hope Yellowbear, U.S. murder victim
Marcela Topor, journalist, born in Romania
Marcela Valladolid, celebrity chef
Marcela Zamora, Salvadoran-Nicaraguan documentary director and journalist
Marcela, the plant Achyrocline satureioides

See also
Marcella (disambiguation), the Italian equivalent
Marcel (given name)

Feminine given names
Romanian feminine given names
Portuguese feminine given names
Spanish feminine given names